Zibotentan (INN; development code ZD4054) is an experimental anti-cancer drug candidate in development by AstraZeneca.  It is an endothelin receptor antagonist.

Zibotentan was granted fast track status for the treatment of prostate cancer by the FDA.

It failed a phase III clinical trial for prostate cancer, but other trials are planned. Tolerability of zibotentan plus docetaxel has been evaluated.

Zibotentan has also been studied in clinical trials for treatment of breast cancer, colorectal cancer, non-small cell lung cancer, ovarian cancer, scleroderma-related renal disease, bone metastasis, and heart failure.

References

External links
 Zibotentan

Experimental cancer drugs
Oxadiazoles
Pyridines
Sulfonamides
Pyrazines
Endothelin receptor antagonists